Ray Anderson Sandoval Baylón (born May 29, 1995) is a Peruvian professional footballer who plays as a winger for Atlético Grau.

References

External links
 
 

1995 births
Living people
Peruvian footballers
Peruvian expatriate footballers
Association football midfielders
Club Deportivo Universidad de San Martín de Porres players
Sporting Cristal footballers
Real Garcilaso footballers
Atlético Morelia players
Mazatlán F.C. footballers
Cusco FC footballers
Atlético Grau footballers
Liga MX players
Peruvian expatriate sportspeople in Mexico
Expatriate footballers in Mexico